George William Butler was a state legislator in Mississippi. He represented Sharkey County, Mississippi in the Mississippi House of Representatives from 1884 to 1894.

In 1884 he served on the Committee of Engrossed Bills.

In 1890, he was described as one of six Republicans in the Mississippi House. He and G. W. Gayles were the last two African Americans to serve in the Mississippi House for the next 74 years when Robert G. Clark served.

See also
 African-American officeholders during and following the Reconstruction era

References

African-American state legislators in Mississippi
Republican Party members of the Mississippi House of Representatives
People from Sharkey County, Mississippi
19th-century African-American politicians
19th-century American politicians
Year of birth missing
Year of death missing